Nabil Hegazi is an Egyptian Emeritus Professor at Cairo University.

References

Academic staff of Cairo University
Living people
Year of birth missing (living people)